Qarabulaq (also, Karabulak) is a village and the least populous municipality in the Khizi Rayon of Azerbaijan.  It has a population of 201.  The municipality consists of the villages of Qarabulaq and Dizəvər.

References 

Populated places in Khizi District